Maxim Lykov (born September 21, 1987 in Balashikha, Russia, Soviet Union) is a professional poker player from Moscow, Russia. He has both a World Series of Poker bracelet and a European Poker Tour title. Lykov is a member of Team PokerStars Pro.

As of 2014, his total live tournament winnings exceed $3,153,000.

World Series of Poker bracelets

References

External links
 Team PokerStars Profile
 HendonMob Results

Russian poker players
World Series of Poker bracelet winners
European Poker Tour winners
1987 births
Living people